Canassatego (c. 1684–1750) was a leader of the Onondaga nation who became a prominent diplomat and spokesman of the Iroquois Confederacy in the 1740s. He was involved in several controversial land sales to colonial British officials. He is now best known for a speech he gave at the 1744 Treaty of Lancaster, where he recommended that the British colonies emulate the Iroquois by forming a confederacy. He was reportedly assassinated, perhaps by sympathizers or agents of New France.

Early career 
Canassatego appears in British historical documents only during the last eight years of his life, and so little is known of his early life. His earliest documented appearance is at a treaty conference in Philadelphia in 1742, where he was a spokesman for the Onondaga people, one of the six nations of the Iroquois (Haudenosaunee) League. According to most modern scholars, Canassatego did not appear to be one of the fourteen Onondaga hereditary sachems who sat on the Iroquois Grand Council. But Johansen disagrees, saying that Canassatego held the League title of Tadadaho.

In the 1730s, a faction of Iroquois leaders opened a diplomatic relationship with the British Province of Pennsylvania, facilitated by Conrad Weiser, Pennsylvania's interpreter and agent. Pennsylvania agreed to recognize the Iroquois as the owner of all Indian lands in Pennsylvania; the Iroquois, in turn, agreed to sell lands only to Pennsylvania representatives. Canassatego probably attended a 1736 treaty where some Iroquois chiefs sold land along the Susquehanna River to Pennsylvania, although the territory had traditionally been occupied by the Lenape people.

Canassatego served as the speaker for the Onondaga at another conference in 1742, where the Iroquois chiefs collected the final payment for the 1736 land sale. At this meeting, Canassatego managed to convince Governor Thomas Penn to pay more than the original purchase price. Penn, for his part, urged Canassatego to remove the Delaware Indians from what was known as the Walking Purchase of 1737, which was quite controversial. Canassatego complied, berating the Delawares as "women" who had no right to sell land, and ordering them to leave. "You are women; take the Advice of a Wise Man and remove immediately", he told the Delaware. The Iroquois denigration of the Delaware as "women" has been the subject of much scholarly writing.

Lancaster treaty
In 1744, Canassatego served as a speaker at meetings to negotiate the Treaty of Lancaster. Witham Marshe, a Marylander in attendance, recorded the only written description of Canassatego:

At the treaty conference were representatives of five of the Iroquois nations (except the Mohawk, the easternmost tribe), and the provinces of Pennsylvania, Maryland, and Virginia. With King George's War underway, the British colonies needed to cultivate a good relationship with their Iroquois neighbors, who might otherwise become French allies. After a speech by Canassatego, officials from Maryland and Virginia agreed to pay the Iroquois for land in their colonies, although they believed that the Iroquois had no legitimate claim to those lands. Virginia got the better part of the deal, however: although Canassatego and other Iroquois leaders believed that they had sold only the Shenandoah Valley to Virginia, the official deed gave Virginia much more land than that.

Near the end of the conference, Canassatego gave the colonists some advice:

Canassatego was concerned that the British colonies lacked a coordinated policy to deal with the military threat coming from New France. He made similar recommendations about colonial unity at another conference in 1745. His words became a central part of the Iroquois Influence Thesis, the controversial proposal that the Iroquois League was a model for the United States Constitution. Canassatego was replaced by Hendrick Theyanoguin as a 6, not 5, Nation diplomat who continued building alliances with Britain's Northern Colonies with his friend William Johnson in 1754.Hendrick Theyanoguin was killed fighting the French a year later. This work, begun by Canassatego and continued by Hendrick Theyanoguin progressed towards Benjamin Franklin's introducing Short Hints towards a Scheme for a General Union of the British Colonies on the Continent, which became the prototype for the US Federal system declared in 1776.

Final years
Canassatego's final appearance at a treaty conference was in August 1749, one year after the end of King George's War. In Philadelphia, he complained that colonists were settling on Native land along the Susquehanna River. He agreed to sell this land to Pennsylvania, but once again, the written document ceded much more land than what had been agreed upon in negotiations.

Canassatego was reportedly assassinated with poison in September 1750. Contemporary accounts that were recorded said that he was killed for taking bribes in exchange for selling tribal communal lands. Another said that he had been poisoned by agents of New France. Historian William Starna argued that Canassatego was probably assassinated by pro-French Iroquois who wanted to repudiate Canassatego's diplomatic ties with Pennsylvania.

Legacy 
A fictional version of Canasatego was featured in the 1755 novel Lydia: or Filial Piety, by English writer John Shebbeare. Following a literary convention by which Native American characters were used to satirize Europeans, Canassatego was portrayed as wise and honest, in stark contrast to the scheming Englishmen he encounters.

The US Navy named the USS Canassatego (YN-38/YNT-6/YTM-732), a harbor tug, for Canasatego.

References 
Notes

Bibliography
Boyd, Julian P., ed. Indian treaties printed by Benjamin Franklin, 1736-1762. Philadelphia, 1938.
Fenton, William N. The Great Law and the Longhouse: a political history of the Iroquois Confederacy. Norman: University of Oklahoma Press, 1998. .
Johansen, Bruce E. "By Your Observing the Methods Our Wise Forefathers Have Taken...." In Barbara Alice Mann, ed. Native American speakers of the Eastern woodlands: selected speeches and critical analyses, 83–105. Greenwood Publishing, 2001. .
Kalter, Susan, ed. Benjamin Franklin, Pennsylvania, and the first nations: the treaties of 1736-62. Urbana: University of Illinois Press, 2006.
Shannon, Timothy J. Iroquois Diplomacy on the Early American Frontier. New York: Viking, 2008. .
Starna, William A. "The Diplomatic Career of Canasatego". In William A. Pencak and Daniel K. Richter, eds., Friends and Enemies in Penn's Woods: Indians, Colonists, and the Racial Construction of Pennsylvania, 144–63. University Park, Pa., 2004.
Bowen, Catherine Drinker, "The Most Dangerous Man in America: Scenes from the life of Benjamin Franklin," Little, Brown and Company, 1974.

1680s births
1750 deaths
18th-century Native Americans
Deaths by poisoning
Native American leaders
Onondaga people